Radobica is a village and municipality in Prievidza District in the Trenčín Region of western Slovakia.

History
In historical records the village was first mentioned in 1324.

Geography
The municipality lies at an altitude of 380 metres and covers an area of 11.454 km². It has a population of about 566 people.

External links
http://www.statistics.sk/mosmis/eng/run.html

Villages and municipalities in Prievidza District